Menaka is an Apsara (heavenly nymph) in Hindu literature.

Legends
Menaka was born during the churning of the ocean by the devas and asuras. She is one of the most mesmerising apsaras (celestial nymphs) in the three worlds, with quick intelligence and innate talent, but desired a family.

Vishvamitra, one of the most respected and revered sages in ancient India, frightened the devas and even tried to create another heaven - Indra, frightened by his powers, sent Menaka from heaven to earth to lure him and break his meditation. Menaka successfully incited Vishwamitra's lust and passion when he saw her beauty. She succeeded in breaking the meditation of Vishvamitra. However, she fell in genuine love with him and a baby was born to them, who later grew in Sage Kanva's ashram and came to be called Shakuntala. Later, Shakuntala falls in love with King Dushyanta and gives birth to a child called Bharata, who in Hindu tradition, lent his name to the country.

When Vishvamitra realized that he had been tricked by Indra, he was enraged. But he merely cursed Menaka to be separated from him forever, for he loved her as well and knew that she had lost all devious intentions towards him long ago.

In the Mahabharata's Pauloma Parva, Sauti said that Menaka had a daughter with the gandharva Visvavasu. She was ashamed of giving birth to the child, so she left her in front of sage Sthulakesha's hermitage. The sage adopted the child and named her Pramadvara, who later married Ruru, descendant of Bhrigu.

References

External links

 Characters in the Ramayana
 Apsara